The 1977 New York City Marathon was the 8th edition of the New York City Marathon and took place in New York City on 23 October.

Results

Men

Women

References

External links

New York City
Marathon
New York City Marathon
New York City Marathon